The Kindu Massacre, or Kindu Atrocity, took place on the 11th or 12th of November 1961 in Kindu Port-Émpain, in the Congo-Léopoldville (the former Belgian Congo). Thirteen Italian airmen who were members of the United Nations Operation in the Congo, sent to pacify the country ravaged by civil war, were murdered and cannibalized by locals.

The Italian aviators manned two C-119s, twin-engined transport aircraft known as Flying Boxcars, of the 46ª Aerobrigata based at Pisa Airfield.

Background 
By 1960, the former Belgian colony had become a prosperous country with vast resources of natural wealth. The Belgians had planned a peaceful transition of self-government and independence for the people of the country by 1964. However, calls for early independence had been made by the most extreme faction of the country’s political groups and Belgium agreed in order to avoid an Algerian style of civil war. Belgium left Congo-Léopoldville (to-day known as the Democratic Republic of the Congo) as agreed but political and administrative chaos ensued; major Cold War and financial interests played a part in making the situation even more serious by favoring the secession of two regions, South Kasai and Katanga. Katanga was the richest province in the country with important mining activity.

Three factions were involved: Joseph Kasa-Vubu's, with troops led by General Joseph-Désiré Mobutu, the pro-Lumumba faction led by Antoine Gizenga with troops under the command of General Victor Lundula holding the eastern province; and Moise Tshombe's Katangan faction, with gendarmes supported by foreign mercenaries.

The massacre
The two Italian aircrews had been operating for a year and a half in the Congo and their return to Italy was scheduled for 23 November 1961. In the morning of Saturday 11 November 1961, the two aircraft took off from the capital city Leopoldville (now Kinshasa) to supply the small Malaysian United Nations garrison controlling the airfield not far from Kindu, on the edge of the equatorial forest.

Europeans stayed in the area very unwillingly, because of the upheaval caused by the passing of Gizenga troops coming from Stanleyville and bound for Katanga.

However, the Italian aircrew did not have to stay, save for the unloading of the aircraft and to have a brief lunch. Then they planned to fly back to base within the day.

The two C-119s appeared in the sky above Kindu shortly after 2 PM, circled over the village a couple of times, then they landed. Tensions had been higher than usual in the days prior. Among the two thousand Congolese soldiers in Kindu, rumors had spread that an airdrop by Tshombe's parachutists was imminent; Gizenga's troops, operating 500 kilometers due south in northern Katanga, had been bombed by Katangese aircraft for months.

On Saturday, the Congolese saw the two aircraft in the sky, increasing their fear and suspicions. Suspicion that paratroopers were coming became certainty. Possessed by terror and fury, the soldiers jumped onto trucks bound for the airfield and for the UN canteen, a small villa one kilometer away, where Maggiore (Major) Parmeggiani and other Italians were having lunch with Major Maud, leader of the Malaysian garrison. Upon the arrival of the Congolese, more and more numerous and threatening, the unarmed Italians tried to barricade themselves in the building but were taken prisoner. The few Malaysian guards were soon overpowered and manhandled. First to die was Medic Tenente Remotti while trying to escape. The twelve survivors were assaulted, who were by then bloody and bruised, were loaded on two trucks with Remotti's body, taken into uptown and unloaded at the end of the main street, Avenue Lumumba Liberateur, in front of the prison, a low red-brick building surrounded by a wall.

At dusk the Italian airmen were finished off with two bursts of small arms. Then a crowd got hold of the butchered bodies and cut them up with machetes.

They were falsely accused of supplying weapons to Katangan secessionists. The militiamen spread rumors that the Italian aviators were flying towards Katanga and had been tricked into landing at Kindu by control tower personnel; however, special correspondent Alberto Ronchey (for the Italian newspaper La Stampa) found out a few days later that the control tower had been out of order for months ahead of the killings. It was only in February 1962 that the remains of those Italians, martyrs of a peacekeeping mission, were discovered in two long and tight pits in the cemetery at Tokolote, a small village near the Lualaba River, on the edge of the woods.

Another Italian had been killed in Congo some days earlier during an ambush by guerrillas: Italian Red Cross Lieutenant Raffaele Soru, was also decorated with the Gold Medal of Military Valor.

United Nations and Congolese response

On November 13th, General Victor Lundula dispatched two army officials with the accompaniment of two UN officers to Kindu to investigate. Colonel Pakassa refused to acknowledge their authority, and claimed that the Italians had escaped his soldiers' custody. Lundula then traveled to Kindu to insist that Pakassa file a formal report on the incident, upon which Pakassa told him that he had no information to share. Lundula and Minister of Interior Christophe Gbenye submitted a formal report on the incident.

The UN reinforced its garrison at Kindu and immediately prepared to disarm the rebellious Congolese soldiers. News of this action infuriated the pro-Gizenga ministers in the central government, leading to violent incidents in Parliament. Prime Minister Cyrille Adoula held a closed session, after which he denounced the UN's actions and declared their investigative commission unnecessary in the face of Lundula's and Gbenye's report. Two days later Officer in charge of UN Operations in the Congo Sture Linner agreed not to disarm the Stanleyville troops. Pokassa was later arrested by Lundula after Gizenga's regime in the eastern Congo collapsed. The perpetrators of the murders were never punished.

Commemorations
In 1994 they were awarded the Gold Medal of Military Valor. Here are the names of the airforcemen. (USAF ranks are added for comparison).

 Onorio De Luca, Sottotenente (2nd Lieutenant) pilot, age 25;
 Filippo Di Giovanni, Maresciallo motorista 3° Classe (Master Sergeant engineer) age 42 (a former POW in the US and member of the Torpedo Bomber arm of the Regia Aeronautica in WWII);
 Armando Fabi, Sergente Maggiore (Staff Sergeant) board electrician, age 30;
 Giulio Garbati, Sottotenente (2nd Lieutenant) pilot, age 22;
 Giorgio Gonelli, Capitano (Captain) pilot, age 31, deputy commander;
 Antonio Mamone, Sergente (Airman First Class) wireless operator, age 28;
 Martano Marcacci, Sergente (Airman First Class) board electrician, age 27;
 Nazzareno Quadrumani, Maresciallo 3° Classe (Master Sergeant) engineer, age 42 (born in Montefalco, Perugia). Former member of Regia Aeronautica and Italian Co-Belligerent Air Force;
 Francesco Paga, sergente (Airman First Class) wireless operator, age 31;
 Amedeo Parmeggiani, Maggiore (Major) pilot, age 43, commanding officer of both aircrews; former member of 21° Gruppo Caccia of the Regia Aeronautica and veteran of the Russian, Sicily, and Italian Campaign;
 Silvestro Possenti, sergente maggiore montatore (Staff Sergeant assembly operator), age 40, veteran of Regia Aeronautica and Italian Co-Belligerent Air Force;
 Francesco Paolo Remotti, Tenente (First Lieutenant) medic, age 29;
 Nicola Stigliani, Sergente Maggiore montatore (Staff Sergeant, assembly operator) age 30;

It was not until 2007 that the victims' relatives were awarded compensation. A monument to the Kindu victims can be found at the entrance of Leonardo da Vinci-Fiumicino Airport in Rome; another was erected in Pisa.

Citations

References 
 
 

1961 in the Republic of the Congo (Léopoldville)
Massacres in the Democratic Republic of the Congo
Italian Air Force personnel
Mass murder in 1961
History of Katanga
Congo Crisis
November 1961 events in Africa